Voisin (French for "neighbour") may refer to:

Companies 
Avions Voisin, the French automobile company 
Voisin Laboratoire, a car manufactured by Avions Voisin
Voisin (aircraft), the French aircraft manufacturer
 Voisin, a Lyon-based chocolatier, owned by the Boucaud family, which manufactures Coussin de Lyon

Buildings 
 Château de Voisins (Louveciennes), French palace

People 
André Voisin (1903-1964), French biochemist, farmer and author
André Voisin, French chess player
Adrien Voisin (1890–1979), American sculptor
Benjamin Voisin, (born 1996), French actor
Catherine Monvoisin, known as "La Voisin" (1640–1680), French sorceress during the reign of Louis XIV
Charles-Henri-Joseph Voisin (1887–1942), Belgian lawyer and colonial administrator.
Claire Voisin mathematician, algebraic geometer, and authority on the Hodge conjecture.
Daisy Voisin (1924–1991), born Alexandra Voisin, Parang singer and composer from Trinidad and Tobago
Félix Voisin (1794–1872), French psychiatrist
Gabriel Voisin (1880–1973), French aviation pioneer
Mac Voisin, founder of M&M Meat Shops of Canada 
Marie Taglioni, Comtesse de Voisins (1804–1884), Swedish ballet dancer
Pierre Voisin (1910–1987), French journalist
René Voisin (1893–1952), French trumpeter
Roch Voisine (born 1963), Canadian singer-songwriter, actor, and radio and TV host
Roger Voisin (1918–2008), American classical trumpeter